Badabandha Road railway station is a railway station on the East Coast Railway network in the state of Odisha, India. It serves Badabandha Road. Its code is BDBA. It has two platforms. Passenger, MEMU and Express trains halt at Badabandha Road railway station.

Major trains
 Paradeep–Puri Intercity Express

See also
 Jagatsinghpur district

References

Railway stations in Jagatsinghpur district
Khurda Road railway division